Thomas Brocas (fl. 1390–1404) of Compton, Surrey, was an English politician.

Family
He had three sons: Thomas, John and the MP, Arnold Brocas. He is likely to have been related to Hampshire MP, Bernard Brocas.

Career
He was a Member (MP) of the Parliament of England for Guildford in January 1390, 1395 and January 1404.

References

14th-century births
15th-century deaths
English MPs January 1390
English MPs 1395
English MPs January 1404
People from Surrey